The Douglas State Trail is a  multiple-use rail trail in Minnesota, USA.

It occupies the abandoned Chicago Great Western Railway corridor between Rochester and Pine Island, passing through Douglas along the way.  The trail has a paved track for cyclists, hikers, in-line skaters and skiers, as well as a natural surface track for horseback riders and snowmobilers.

The Cannon Valley Trail between Cannon Falls and Red Wing makes use of another segment of the same abandoned CGW right-of-way.

External links
 Douglas State Trail

Protected areas of Goodhue County, Minnesota
Minnesota state trails
Protected areas of Olmsted County, Minnesota
Rail trails in Minnesota